This is a list of monasteries in Syria.

Catholic

Catholic
 St. Thomas Roman Monastery (Deir Mar Touma), Saidnaya.

Melkite Greek
 Monastery of Saint James the Mutilated (Qara) (Jacques le Mutilé) (Deir Mar Yakub), Qara.
 St. Sergius monastery (Mar Sarkis), Maaloula

Syrian
 Monastery of Saint Moses the Abyssinian (Deir Mar Musa), Al-Nabek.
 Monastery of Saint Elian, Al-Qaryatayn (reportedly destroyed by ISIL)

Orthodox

Coptic
 Avraam Monastery, Maarat Saidnaya

Greek
 Our Lady (Dormition) Convent, Baniyas
 St. George Monastery, Mahardah
 Holy Transfiguration Monastery, Kafr Ram, Homs
 St John the Baptist Monastery, Aleppo
 Our Lady of Saidnaya Monastery, Saidnaya
 St. Elias Monastery (Deir Mar Elias), Saidnaya
 Cherubim Convent (Deir Cherubim-Shirubeim), Saidnaya
 Saint Thekla Convent (Mar Taqla), Maaloula
 Saint George Monastery, Homs

Syrian
St Ephrems Patriarchal Monastery, Maarat Saidnaya
 Convent of Our Lady, Saidnaya
 St. Estphariuos Orthodox Monastery, Saidnaya
 St. Mary's Monastery (Morth Maryam), Tel Wardiat, al-Hasakah

References 

 
Syria
Monasteries